Mordellistena krujanensis is a species of beetle in the genus Mordellistena of the family Mordellidae, which is part of the superfamily Tenebrionoidea. It was described in 1963 by Ermisch.

References

Beetles described in 1963
krujanensis
Endemic fauna of Germany